Luc Genolet (born 18 September 1963) is a former Swiss alpine skier who won the Europa Cup overall title in 1985.

Career
During his career he has achieved 4 results among the top 10 in the World Cup.

World Cup results
Top 10

Europa Cup results
Genolet has won an overall Europa Cup and one discipline cup.

FIS Alpine Ski Europa Cup
Overall: 1985
Downhill: 1984

References

External links
 

1963 births
Living people
Swiss male alpine skiers